The Spotlight Awards (GDC) was hosted annually by the Game Developers Conference from 1997 to 1999. Its focus was on the video and computer game industry. GDC now hosts another video game award ceremony called Game Developers Choice Awards since 2001.

List of winners

Best Game
1997 : Super Mario 64

Best Console Game
1997 : Super Mario 64
1998 : (not awarded)
1999 : The Legend of Zelda: Ocarina of Time

Best PC/Mac Game
1997 : Civilization II
1998 : (not awarded)
1999 : Half-Life

Best Arcade Game
1997 : Virtua Fighter 3

Best Action Game
1997 : Duke Nukem 3D
1998 : Quake II
1999 : Half-Life

Best Adventure Game/RPG
1997 : The Elder Scrolls II: Daggerfall
1998 : Final Fantasy VII
1999 : Baldur's Gate

Best Sports Game
1997 : NHL Hockey '97
1998 :
1999 : NFL Blitz

Best Multiplayer Game
1997 : Quake
1998 : Quake II
1999 : StarCraft

Best Strategy/War Game
1997 : Command and Conquer: Red Alert
1998 :
1999 : StarCraft

Best Simulation Game
1997 : MechWarrior 2: Mercenaries
1998 : (not awarded)
1999 : Gran Turismo

Best Flight or Flight Combat Simulator
1998 :

Best Military Simulation
1998 :

Best Trivia or Puzzle Game
1997 : You Don't Know Jack XL
1998 :
1999 : You Don't Know Jack 4: The Ride

Best Educational/Children's Game
1997 : Freddi Fish 2: The Case of the Haunted Schoolhouse
1998 :
1999 : Lego Creator

Best Use of Audio
1997 : Quake
1998 : PaRappa the Rapper
1999 : Half-Life

Best Music or Soundtrack
1997 : Quake
1998 : Blade Runner

Best New Technology
1997 : Nintendo 64 from Nintendo
1998 :

Best Use of Innovative Technology
1997 : Super Mario 64 for the N64

Best Use of Graphics
1998 : Quake II
1999 : Half-Life

Best Use of Video
1997 : Wing Commander IV

Most Innovative Game Design
1998 : PaRappa the Rapper
1999 : The Legend of Zelda: Ocarina of Time

Best Script, Story or  Interactive Writing
1997 : You Don't Know Jack XL

Best Adaptation of Linear Media
1997 : I Have No Mouth, and I Must Scream

Best AI (Artificial Intelligence)
1999 : Half-Life

Best Animation
1997 : Tomb Raider

Best Prerendered Art
1997 : Zork Nemesis

Annual Achievement Award for Game Design and Development
1998 : Age of Empires

Lifetime Achievement Award for Game Design and Development
1998 : Dani Bunten Berry
1999 : Louis Castle

References 
 Archive / 1999 Spotlight Awards
 Archive / 1998 Spotlight Awards
 Archive / 1997 Spotlight Awards

Video game awards
Awards established in 1997
Awards disestablished in 1999